Richard Leslie Williams (6 May 1905 – 24 August 1958) was an Australian rules footballer who played with Hawthorn in the Victorian Football League (VFL).

He played a single game for Hawthorn in 1929, playing in the same side as his brother Lyall Williams. Both brothers were ministers in the Church of Christ, and Richard's ministry took him to the United States, where he died in 1958.

Notes

External links 

1905 births
1958 deaths
Australian rules footballers from Victoria (Australia)
Hawthorn Football Club players